Pardners in Rhyme is the twenty-sixth studio album by American country music group The Statler Brothers. It was released in 1985 via Mercury Records. The album peaked at number 1 on the Billboard Top Country Albums chart.

Track listing
"Hello Mary Lou" (Cayet Mangiarasina, Gene Pitney) – 2:17
"Sweeter and Sweeter" (Don Reid, Harold Reid) – 3:06
"Memory Lane" (Jimmy Fortune) – 2:37
"Remembering You" (D. Reid, H. Reid) – 2:50
"Too Much on My Heart" (Jimmy Fortune) – 4:02
"I'm Sorry You Had to Be the One" (D. Reid, H. Reid, Fortune) – 3:31
"Her Heart or Mine" (D. Reid, H. Reid) – 2:53
"You Don't Wear Blue So Well" (Cody Reid, Karmen Reid, Kim Reid) – 2:31
"Autumn Leaves" (Fortune) – 2:36
"Amazing Grace" (Arranged by D. Reid, H. Reid, Fortune, Phil Balsley) – 5:15

Charts

Weekly charts

Year-end charts

References

1985 albums
The Statler Brothers albums
Albums produced by Jerry Kennedy
Mercury Records albums